Lacustrelix minor s a species of air-breathing land snails, terrestrial pulmonate gastropod mollusks in the family Camaenidae. This species is endemic to Australia.

References

Gastropods of Australia
minor
Gastropods described in 1992
Taxonomy articles created by Polbot